Manuel Brehmer (born 1 June 1978 in West Berlin, West Germany) is a German rower.

References 

 
 

1978 births
Living people
Rowers from Berlin
Olympic rowers of Germany
Rowers at the 2004 Summer Olympics
Rowers at the 2008 Summer Olympics
World Rowing Championships medalists for Germany
German male rowers